Dregish Pearse Óg was a Gaelic Athletic Association club. The club was based in the townland of Dregish between Drumquin and Castlederg in County Tyrone, Northern Ireland.

The club concentrated on Gaelic football.

The club was named after the Irish Revolutionary Padraig Pearse and drew in players from the rural areas of the parish of Ardstraw West.

Despite having one of the smallest population bases in the county, the club had a proud history of competing, and often finishing above many clubs from neighbouring towns and villages in Division 3.

In November 2019, Dregish Pearse Óg amalgamated with neighbouring club Newtownstewart St Eugene's to form Naomh Eoghan GAC. Dregish had for a number of years been struggling with playing numbers and was rumoured to be disbanding before the amalgamation with Newtownstewart was announced.

References

Gaelic games clubs in County Tyrone
Gaelic football clubs in County Tyrone